Lude House (also known as House of Lude or Lude Estate) is a Category B listed country house and estate in Blair Atholl, Perth and Kinross, Scotland. It was completed in 1839, and it received its historic designation in 1971. The building was designed by William Burn.

Today's building replaces an earlier structure, owned by the Robertson family,  which was demolished in the early 19th century.

As of 2022, it is the seat of Andrew Grant, whose family has owned the estate since 1938. The McInroy family owned it in the 19th century.

The estate's six cottages are available for rental.

References

External links
Lude Estate's official website

Category B listed buildings in Perth and Kinross
Country houses in Perth and Kinross